The Royal Louis was a 116-gun ship of the line of the Royal French Navy, designed in 1757 by Jacques-Luc Coulomb and constructed in 1757 to 1762 by Laurent Coulomb at Brest Dockyard. She was the fourth ship to bear the name, and the only ship of the Sans-Pareil design ever built.

History 
In August 1771, when in dry dock, she was found to have deteriorated beyond repair and was eventually demolished in 1773, without having seen any service.

Legacy 
A 1/18 scale model on display at the Musée national de la Marine in Paris, MnM 13 MG 32, is thought to represent Royal Louis.

Notes and References 
 References

 Bibliography

Nomenclature des navires français de 1715 á 1774. Alain Demerliac (Editions Omega, Nice – 1995). .
Winfield, Rif and Roberts, Stephen (2017) French Warships in the Age of Sail 1626-1786: Design, Construction, Careers and Fates. Seaforth Publishing. .

Ships of the line of the French Navy
1759 ships
Sans-Pareil-class ships of the line